The W.A.R. FW-190 is a half-scale homebuilt replica of a Focke-Wulf Fw 190 fighter. In July 1973, War Aircraft Replicas International of Santa Paula, California began design of an approximately half-scale replica of the Fw 190, the first of a series of replicas of World War II aircraft using similar constructional techniques. The first prototype made its maiden flight on 21 August 1974.

Design and development
The aircraft structure is based on a wooden framework for the fuselage and wings, using polyurethane foam to build up the fuselage shape and wing aerofoil profile, with a fabric/epoxy covering. The aircraft is fitted with an electrically retractable tailwheel undercarriage to match the configuration of the original aircraft. Small Continental Motors, Inc. and Lycoming Engines of  have commonly been used.

The prototype aircraft was displayed at the Experimental Aircraft Association convention in 1974. Realistic details such as simulated fabric surfaces, and detailed smoke trails were noted, the aircraft drew a large amount of attention at the show.

At least 197 sets of plans had been sold by 1982, and plans remain on sale from War Aircraft Replicas, now based in Florida.

Variants
Some versions were built using  Lycoming O-235 and  HCI radial engines.

Specifications (W.A.R. FW-190)

Notes

References

Taylor, John W. R. Jane's All The World's Aircraft 1982–83. London:Jane's Yearbooks, 1982. .
Taylor, John W. R. Jane's All The World's Aircraft 1988–89. Coulsdon, UK:Jane's Defence Data, 1988. .

WAR German FW 190

External links

 War Aircraft Replicas International Inc 

Homebuilt aircraft
FW-190
Single-engined tractor aircraft
Low-wing aircraft
1970s United States sport aircraft
Focke-Wulf Fw 190
Replica aircraft
Aircraft first flown in 1974